Richard Douglas Green (born February 20, 1956) is a Canadian former ice hockey defenceman. He won the 1986 Stanley Cup with the Montreal Canadiens.

Biography
As a youth, Green played in the 1968 and 1969 Quebec International Pee-Wee Hockey Tournaments with minor ice hockey teams from Toronto.

Green spent his junior career with the London Knights of the OHA, where he earned the Max Kaminsky Trophy for Most Outstanding Defenceman as selected by league general managers in 1976.

Green was drafted first overall by the Washington Capitals in the 1976 NHL Amateur Draft. He was also drafted 10th overall by the Quebec Nordiques in the 1976 WHA Amateur Draft.

In September 1982, after spending his first six seasons with the Washington Capitals, Green and Ryan Walter were traded to the Montreal Canadiens as part of a six-player blockbuster deal in exchange for Brian Engblom, Doug Jarvis, Rod Langway and Craig Laughlin. Green went on to win his first Stanley Cup ring with the Canadiens in 1986.

Following his stint with the Canadiens, Green would spend the final seasons of his career as a member of the Detroit Red Wings and the New York Islanders, before retiring as a player in 1991. 

Green later made the transition from a player to an assistant coach, where he served on the coaching staffs for two of his former teams, the Islanders and the Canadiens, as well as the Los Angeles Kings.

Career statistics

Regular season and playoffs

International

References

External links

Profile at hockeydraftcentral.com

1956 births
Living people
Canadian ice hockey defencemen
Detroit Red Wings players
Ice hockey people from Ontario
London Knights players
Los Angeles Kings coaches
Montreal Canadiens coaches
Montreal Canadiens players
National Hockey League assistant coaches
National Hockey League first-overall draft picks
National Hockey League first-round draft picks
New York Islanders coaches
New York Islanders players
Quebec Nordiques (WHA) draft picks
Sportspeople from Belleville, Ontario
Stanley Cup champions
Washington Capitals draft picks
Washington Capitals players
World Hockey Association first round draft picks
Canadian ice hockey coaches